Hilary Ann Phillips CD, QC (born February 26, 1951) is a Jamaican attorney-at-law and magistrate. She has served as a judge of the Court of Appeal since 2009.

Early life and education
Phillips was born in Kingston, Jamaica on February 26, 1951, to father Rowland Phillips and mother Enid Daphne Phillips (née Limonius). She attended the St Andrew High School and is a graduate of the University of the West Indies, where she received a Bachelor of Science degree in Management Studies. She also attended the College of Law of England and Wales where she qualified as a solicitor.

Judicial career
Phillips was called to the Bar on August 8, 1974. She was appointed Queen's Counsel in April 1998. She is a member of the Bar Association of Jamaica, and served as its first female president from 2001 to 2004. Phillips worked at the Norman Manley Law School as a tutor in civil procedure since 1994. She has been a member of the General Legal Council since 1984, as well as a member of its disciplinary committee. She served as vice-president of the Organisation of Commonwealth Caribbean Bar Associations from 2003-2006. Phillips was a senior partner at the law firm Grant, Stuart, Phillips and Company. On July 20, 2009, she was sworn in as a Judge of the Court of Appeal by Governor General Sir Patrick Allen. She has also served as the acting President of the Court of Appeal.

Honors and awards
Phillips was awarded the Order of Distinction, Commander class for services to the legal profession and to the judiciary in 2013.

Personal life
Phillips is the daughter of the late Sir Rowland Phillips, Chief Justice of Jamaica (1963–1968).

References

1951 births
Living people
People from Kingston, Jamaica
University of the West Indies alumni